Ibrahim Sultan can refer to:
 Ibrahim Sultan ibn Shahrukh (died 1435), a Timurid prince who governed Fars
 Ibrahim Sultan Ali (1909–1987), an Eritrean independence activist